The Dating Guy is a Canadian adult animated series that originally aired on Teletoon at Night starting on September 17, 2008 and ending on May 8, 2010. 

The show was created by Matt Hornburg and Mark Bishop, with executive producers being John Morayniss and Frank Saperstein. Produced by marblemedia and Entertainment One, the show also has a Gemini Award-winning tie-in website, with two web series: The Morning After Show, which discusses episodes of the main show, and Dr. Love, which features an in-depth look at dating; unlike the show, the web series are live action.

The show's premise revolves around the adventures of four Canadian twenty-something friends living in Downtown Toronto, looking for love in all the wrong places. Guests such as Russell Peters and Howie Mandel appear on the show.

Development
The show's existence was first noted in 2006; at the time, C.O.R.E., who had most recently produced The Wild, was slated to provide animation services. By 2007, a different animation studio was being sought, with the show then-scheduled to premiere in late 2008. Smiley Guy Studios in Toronto was the animation service. and later in March 2009.

According to Frank Saperstein, the idea behind the show is based on the real-life dating experience of one of its creators. The influence of the founders of marblemedia, Matt Hornburg and Mark Bishop, on the show's premise has also been noted.

Characters
The show focuses on four main characters who constitute a group of friends, Mark, VJ, Woody, and Sam, and a number of recurring characters.

Main characters
Mark Dexler (Fab Filippo) – Mark is a 25-year-old single man who works as a copywriter at an ad agency. He shares an apartment with his best friends VJ and Woody.
VJ Mendhi (Anand Rajaram) – Mark's Indian Canadian, virgin roommate. He works in IT at the same ad agency Mark works at. Despite sharing an apartment with his friends Mark and Woody, he does not pay rent. He is extremely perverted and has seen all the internet porn in the world. It is revealed in the episode 'Too Fast, Too Dexler', that VJ is short for Vagina.
Woodrow "Woody" Jenkins (Sean Francis) – the womanizing, Black Canadian bartender of the Hotel Ego bar, and lives with his Mark and VJ.
Samantha "Sam" Goldman (Lauren Ash) – Mark's neighbor and friend, who is a concert promoter.

Recurring characters
Anderson Anderson (Gabriel Hogan) – Sam's one-and-off-again boyfriend, from the US, who has multiple careers.
Celia (Bryn McAuley) – a country Mormon who is new to the city and works at te Hotel Ego bar with Woody (season 2).
Vince (Louis Ferreira) – a police officer who takes his job very seriously and his speech is vaguely similar to Al Pacino. He once dated Sam and remains a friend to her.
Wang (Albert Chung) – the owner of A Taste of Wang the local Chinese restaurant, who is also a part-time drug dealer.
Lily Wang - Mr. Wang's daughter and employee, who is VJ's love interest and a former girlfriend of Irwin.
Vikram Cha Cha (Sugith Varughese) – VJ's veterinarian uncle.
Irwin Chang – the leader of the Chinese mafia who is menacing, despite the fact that he rarely speaks and usually communicates through blowing smoke rings.
Rudolph - Irwin's accomplice and translator.
Jeff (Tony Daniels) – an Arab who works at a falafel restaurant. He was killed by Cannabis in "Spanking the Monkey".
Randy (Dwayne Hill) – a common thief who steals anything he can get his hands on. He was killed by being frozen by liquid nitrogen in "24ish", but returns in the next episode "Perfect 10 Killer".
Brian Booyah (Howie Mandel) – The CEO of Johnson and Booyah (season 2).
Denise Felcher (Kathleen Laskey) – Mark and VJ's sex addicted boss.
Bryce (Noah Cappe) – Mark's coworker who acts like his boss.
Ursula (Krystal Meadows) – A young coworker of Mark and VJ; whom the latter has a crush on.
Zorro – VJ's perverted, pet raccoon.
Cpt. Steiner – an elderly nazi and Woody's best customer at Hotel Ego.

Episodes
The show ran for two seasons of 13 episodes each.

Season 1

Season 2

Reception
A review of the show prior to its release on Teletoon praised it for its humour but criticized it for a perceived lack of polish. A review of the DVD rated it 2/5, praising the show's eccentricity and references to Canadian culture but criticizing its humour and storyline.

The Dating Guy has also been criticized for allegedly being a ripoff of the webcomic Least I Could Do, which was reportedly submitted to Teletoon to create an animated series. It did not come to fruition. Teletoon has reportedly denied the accusation.

Awards and nominations

Home video releases
A DVD containing only Season 1 was released on April 26, 2011. The first season was also released for online viewing on the US version of Amazon Video. The entire show is available from the Canadian iTunes Store. Seasons 1 and 2 were both available on the US version of Hulu until it was removed in the late 2010s.

References

2010s Canadian adult animated television series
2010s Canadian animated comedy television series
2010s Canadian sitcoms
2010 Canadian television series debuts
2011 Canadian television series endings
Canadian adult animated comedy television series
Canadian animated sitcoms
English-language television shows
Teletoon original programming
Television shows set in Toronto